The Opera Orchestra of New York (also known as OONY) specializes in the performance of opera in concert form. It is particularly known for its work in presenting rarely performed repertory. Among the numerous American premieres it has presented are Puccini's Edgar, Boito's Nerone, and Smetana's Libuše.

History

Founded in 1971 by Eve Queler, who remains its conductor and music director, the orchestra presented its first season in 1972 with two operas – Rossini's William Tell and Meyerbeer's L'africaine – performed at New York's Carnegie Hall. Since then it has gone on to present more than ninety different operas there, with the season now consisting of three to four operas, which are also broadcast on National Public Radio. In the past, tickets came with a complete libretto of the opera being performed. However, the 2007/2008 season introduced surtitles for the first time.

Financial difficulties in early 2007 threatened to close the company or severely curtail its 2007/2008 season to one opera. However, these were overcome, and the 2007/2008 season of three operas opened as planned on 13 December 2007 with Verdi's I due Foscari. An additional Gala concert celebrating Eve Queler's 100th performance conducting the orchestra at Carnegie Hall was presented in March 2008. In 2011, The New York Times reported that the orchestra under new musical director Alberto Veronesi had returned to financial stability.

Many prominent opera singers have performed with the orchestra including Plácido Domingo, Nicolai Gedda, Montserrat Caballé, Carlo Bergonzi, Renata Scotto, Alfredo Kraus, José Carreras, Dmitri Hvorostovsky, Bryan Hymel, Angela Meade, Jennifer Larmore, Samuel Ramey, James Morris, Angela Gheorghiu, Roberto Alagna, Jonas Kaufmann, Mignon Dunn, Grace Bumbry and Ghena Dimitrova, many of them in the very early stages of their careers. (José Carreras made his OONY debut in 1972 on his twenty-fourth birthday.)

In 1978, the Opera Orchestra of New York instituted a Young Artists Program to train and showcase young singers. Participants sing small roles in the Carnegie Hall performances and understudy the principal ones. Notable past participants in the program include Renée Fleming, Vivica Genaux and Deborah Voigt.

Performance

2000s

2016
May: Donizetti – Parisina d'Este: Meade, Blake, Vemic, Wang
2014
June: Donizetti -Roberto Devereux: Devia, Costello, Chauvet, Kapusta

2012–2013
Jan: Giordano – Andrea Chénier: Alagna, Petean, Pershall, Feinstein, Lamanda
Apr: Verdi – I Lombardi: Fabiano, Meade, Short, Baetge, Cedel, Baldwin, et al.

2011–2012
Nov: Cilèa – Adriana Lecouvreur: Gheorghiu, Kaufmann, Maestri, Rachvelishvili
Jan: Wagner – Rienzi: Storey, Matos, Chauvet, DeVine, Cedel, et al.

2010–2011
Oct: Mascagni – Cavalleria rusticana: Alagna, Guleghina, Dunn, Almaguer, Swann
Oct: Massenet – La Navarraise: Alagna, Garanca, Abdrazakov, Savage, Kontes, McGee
Mar: Meyerbeer – L'Africaine: Giordani, Taigi, Dehn, Mvinjelwa

2008–2009
Oct: Rimsky-Korsakov – The Tsar's Bride: Borodina, Makarina, Markov, Manucharyan, Stamboglis, Easterlin, Nance, Miller, Stepanov, Sullivan, McGee

2007–2008
Dec: Verdi – I due Foscari: DiGiacomo, Gavanelli, Grooms, Machado, Lagundino, Lugo, Orsalak
Feb: Bellini – La Sonnambula: Gutié;rrez, Korchak, Furlanetto, Caballero, Garcia, Kontes, Grooms
April: Puccini – Edgar: Giordani, Larmore, Moore, Gaertner, Guagliardo

2006–2007
Nov: Donizetti – Dom Sébastien: Kasarova, Korchak, Powell, Gaertner, Williams
Jan: Rossini- Otello: Donose, Ford, Tarver, McPherson
Feb: Cilèa – L'Arlesiana: Cornetti, Filianoti, Moore, Risinger, Lee

2005–2006
Nov: Rossini – William Tell: Blasi, Giordani, Chingari
Feb: Delibes – Lakmé: Gutiérrez, Manucharyan, Morris
May: Montemezzi – L'Amore Dei Tre Re: Bravo, Casanova, Ramey

2004–2005
Nov: Puccini – La Fanciulla del West: Millo, Tanner, Chingari
April: Thomas – Mignon: Gutiérrez, Blythe, Aldrich, Giordano, Relyea
June: Weber – Der Freischütz: Margiono, Moon, Studebaker, Kowaljow

2003–2004
Dec: Donizetti – Anna Bolena: Stoyanova, Larmore, Aldrich, Manucharyan, Morris
Mar: Verdi – Il Corsaro: Dragoni, Potenza, Casanova, Liao
April: Ponchielli – La Gioconda: Millo, Kitic, Nadler, Giordani, Golesorkhi, Faria

2002–2003
Oct: Bizet – Les Pêcheurs de Perles: Takova, Shtoda, Chaignaud, Faria
April: Verdi – Attila: Flanigan, Casanova, Liao, Ramey
May: Rossini – La donna del lago: Swenson, Blythe, Fowler, Zeffiri, Youngblood

2001–2002
Nov: Verdi – La Battaglia di Legnano: Stoyanova, Wood, Casanova, Guelfi, Kowaljow
Mar: Cilèa – Adriana Lecouvreur: Millo, Ernest, Stewart, Zajick, Giordani, Laciura, Golesorkhi
April: Donizetti – Marino Faliero: Blancas, Bernhardt, Blake, Liao, Relyea

2000–2001
Mar: Donizetti – La Favorita: Larmore, Gilbert, Kunde, Hvorostovsky, Kowaljow
April: Meyerbeer – Les Huguenots: Stoyanova, Makarina, Zifchak, Giordani, Simpson, Faria
May: Donizetti – Maria Stuarda: Swenson, Flanigan, Matos, Kunde, Liao, Carfizzi

1990s

1999–2000
Oct: Bellini – I Capuleti e i Montecchi: Massis, Kasarova, Kunde, Carfizzi, Cokorinos
Nov: Donizetti – Adelia: Devia, Mok, Pyatnychko, Plishka
Feb: Donizetti – Lucrezia Borgia: Fleming, Blythe, Giordani, Peterson
May: Verdi – Otello: Esperian, Kitic, Bergonzi/Barasorda, Zhang, Gazale, Plishka

1998–1999
Mar: Verdi – I Masnadieri: Wolf, Nagore, Hvorostovsky, Plishka, Konstantinov
April: Halévy – La Juive: Papian, Makarina, Casanova, Viala, Plishka
May: Bellini – La Sonnambula: Swenson, Tapia, Wood, Kunde, Relyea

1997–1998
Nov: Rossini – Tancredi: O'Flynn, Kasarova, Poretsky, Wood, Breault, Boutros
Feb: Verdi – Jerusalem: Valayre, Ikaia-Purdy, Simpson
May: Donizetti – Poliuto: Rowland, Armiliato, Meoni, Alberghini

1996–1997
Jan: Rossini – La Cenerentola: Genaux, Makarina, Wood, Fowler, G. Quilico
Feb: Wagner – Tristan und Isolde: Connell, Lang, Siukola, Ryerson, Breault, Brainerd
April: Verdi – Ernani: Anderson, Margison, Guelfi, Plishka

1995–1996
Dec: Bellini- Norma: Eaglen, Ganassi, Furdui, di Renzi, Anisimov, Moore
April: Rossini – Armida: Fleming, Kunde, Fowler
May: Verdi – Giovanna d'Arco: Anderson, Grigorian, Moore, Guelfi, Owens

1994–1995
Feb: Massenet – Hérodiade: Fleming, Bumbry, Keyes, Del Campo
Mar: Rimsky-Korsakov – The Tsar's Bride: Focile, Borodina, Uhlenhopp, Leiferkus, Plishka
May: Bellini – I Puritani : Devia, Wood, Kunde, Guelfi, Peterson

1993–1994
Dec: Donizetti – Linda di Chamounix: Esposito, Poretsky, Sabbatini, Frontali, Heimann, Plishka
Feb: Bellini – I Capuleti e i Montecchi: Devia, Larmore, Gimenez, Spagnoli, Robbins
Mar: Donizetti – Caterina Cornaro: Rowland, d'Auria, Bruson, Colombara

1992–1993
Feb: Bellini – La Straniera: Fleming, Liang, Kunde, Laperriere
Apr: Donizetti – Anna Bolena: Vaness, Scalchi, Sonnenberg, de la Mora, Plishka
May: Tchaikovsky – Mazeppa: Anderson, Grunewald, Grigorian, Leiferkus, Plishka

1991–1992
Jan: Boieldieu – La Dame Blanche: Fleming, Uecker, Swensen, Charbonneau, Castel (Narrator)
Mar: Wagner – Rienzi: Pick-Hieronimi, Graham, Goldberg
Apr: Verdi – I Due Foscari: Rowland, Short, Villa, Chernov

1990–1991
Jan: Donizetti – Roberto Devereux: Rowland, Zambalis, de la Mora, Chernov
Feb: Bellini – La Sonnambula: Anderson, Keith, Gimenez, Plishka
Mar: Weber – Der Freischütz: Behrens, Giering, Heppner, Rahming, Sotin

1980s

1989–1990
Jan: Verdi – I Vespri Siciliani: S. Dunn, Brubaker/Glassman, Bruson, Plishka
Feb: Tchaikovsky – Maid of Orleans: Martin, Zajick, Kulko, Hynninen, Koptchak, Nikolsky
April: Catalani – La Wally: Millo, Kotoski, Johannsson, Manuguerra

1988–1989
Oct: Bellini – Beatrice di Tenda: Anderson, Zseller, Kiurkciev, Tumagian
Jan: Giordano – Fedora: Marton, Blackwell, Todisco, Serrano
Mar: Bellini – Il Pirata: Millo, Liang, Morino, Croft

1987–1988
Feb: Meyerbeer – Robert le Diable: Mims, Ginsberg, Merritt, Laciura, Ramey
Mar: Giordano – Andrea Chénier: Millo, Bean, Polozov, Laciura
Mar: Janáček – Jenufa: Benacková, Rysanek, Ochman, Kazaras

1986–1987
Jan: Verdi – La Battaglia di Legnano: Millo, Malagnini, Manuguerra, Hines
Feb: Wagner – Ring Cycle final scenes: Marton, Bean, Goldberg, McFarland, Roloff
May: Dvořák – Rusalka: Benacková, Kelm, Jenkins, Koptchak

1985–1986
Jan: Verdi – I Lombardi: Millo, Ginsberg, Bergonzi, Di Domenico, Plishka
Mar: Smetana – Libuše: Benacková, Roark-Strummer, Zitek, Plishka
May: Ponchielli – La Giaconda: Dimitrova, Milcheva, Curry, Lamberti, Cappuccilli, Plishka

1984–1985
Oct: Glinka – A Life for the Tsar: Markova, Wenkel, Merritt, Talvela
Nov: Rossini – William Tell: Evstatieva, Lopardo, Cappuccilli, Bonisolli
April: Lalo – Le Roi d'Ys: Hendricks, Ciurca, Raffalli, Vento

1983–1984
Nov: Strauss, R. – Die Liebe der Danae: Plowright, Blackwell, Ulfung, Kazaras, Roloff
Mar: Donizetti – Dom Sébastien: Takacs, Leech, Miller, Koptchak
May: Verdi – Nabucco: Dimitrova, Schuman, Pinto, Monk, Plishka

1982–1983
Oct: Donizetti – Il Duca d'Alba: Krilovici, Gonzalez, Manuguerra
Jan: Strauss, R. – Guntram: Tokody, Goldberg, Roloff, Wimberger
May: Berlioz – Benvenuto Cellini: Devia, Boozer, Gedda, Lafont, Vento

1981–1982
Oct: Verdi – I Due Foscari: Castro-Alberty, Bergonzi, Bruson, Albert
Feb: Wagner – Rienzi: Massey, Payer, Warner, Hamari, Albert, Johns, Poole, Behl
Mar: Wagner – Rienzi: Evans, Hamari, Johns
April: Boito – Nerone: Andrade, Takács, Cigoj, Elvira, Morris

1980–1981
Mar: Mussorgsky – Khovanshchina: Alexieva, Toczyska, Kazaras, Gulyas, Mroz, Monk, Plishka
April: Delibes – Lakmé: Devia, Spacagna, Gedda, Plishka
June: Mercadante – Il Giuramento: Zampieri, Martin, Baltsa, Gulyas, Edwards

1970s

1979–1980
Feb: Massenet – Hérodiade: Verdejo, Greevy, Estes, Pons, Plishka
Mar: Donizetti – Lucrezia Borgia: Ricciarelli, Gonzalez, Manuguerra
April: Wagner – Rienzi: Payer, Hamari, Sooter

1978–1979
Feb: Janáček – Kátya Kabanová: Benacková, Kniplová, Lewis, Evitts, Chudy
April: Verdi – Aroldo: Caballé, Cecchele, Pons
May: Bellini – I Capuleti e i Montecchi: Putnam, Troyanos, Tenzi, Robbins, Martinovich
1977–1978
Feb: Weber – Oberon: Jones, Hamari, Gedda, West
Mar: Rossini – Tancredi: Ricciarrelli, Balthrop, Horne, Paunova, Palacio, Zaccaria
1976–1977
Jan: Smetana – Dalibor: Sormova, Kubiak, Gedda, Monk, Plishka
April: Puccini – Edgar :Scotto, Killebrew, Bergonzi, Sardinero
1975–1976
Jan: Berlioz – Lélio: Scotto, Aler, Burchinal, Madden (Narrator)
Mar: Massenet – Le Cid: Bumbry, Bergquist, Domingo, Gardner, Voketaitis, Plishka
Mar: Donizetti – Gemma di Vergy: Caballé, Lima, Quilico, Plishka
1974–1975
Feb: Verdi – I Masnadieri: Trombin, Lewis, Manuguerra, Plishka
Feb: Donizetti – La Favorita: Hendricks, Verrett, Kraus, Elvira, Morris
1973–1974
Jan: Bizet: Les Pêcheurs de Perles: Eda-Pierre, Gedda, Bruson, West
Mar: Donizetti – Parisina d'este: Caballé, Pruett, Quilico, Morris
1972–1973
Dec: Verdi – I Lombardi: Scotto, Carreras, Marini, Plishka
Mar: Zandonai – Francesca da Rimini: Kabaivanska, Domingo, Manuguerra
1971–1972
Mar: Rossini – William Tell: Barlow, Toscano, Walker/Lo Monoco, Quilico, Morris
April: Meyerbeer – L'Africaine: Elgar, Stella, Tucker, Manuguerra

Recordings
Gaetano Donizetti: Gemma di Vergy (Montserrat Caballé (Gemma di Vergy), Paul Plishka (Guido), Luis Lima (Tamas), Louis Quilico (Count di Vergy), Natalya Chudy (Ida), Mark Munkittrick (Rolando), Schola Cantorum (Hugh Ross, Director); Opera Orchestra of New York; Conductor: Eve Queler). World premiere recording, recorded live at Carnegie Hall (March 14, 1976). CBS/Sony
Jules Massenet: Le Cid (Grace Bumbry (Chimene), Plácido Domingo (Rodrigo), Paul Plishka (Don Diego), Clinton Ingram (Don Arias), Theodre Hodges (Don Alonzo), Arnold Voketaitis (The Count de Gormas), Eleanor Bergquist (The Infanta), Jake Gardner (The King), Peter Lightfoot (The Moorish Envoy), John Adams (St. James), Byrne Camp Chorale (Bryne Camp, Director); Opera Orchestra of New York; Conductor: Eve Queler). World premiere recording, recorded live at Carnegie Hall (March 8, 1976). CBS/Sony
Giuseppe Verdi: Aroldo (Montserrat Caballé (Mina), Gianfranco Cecchele (Aroldo), Juan Pons (Egberto), Louis Lebherz (Briano), Vincenzo Manno (Godvino), Paul Ragers (Enrico), Marianna Busching (Elena), Oratorio Society of New York, Westchester Choral Society (Lyndon Woodside, Director); Opera Orchestra of New York; Conductor: Eve Queler). World premiere recording, recorded live at Carnegie Hall (April 1979). CBS/Sony

References

Further reading
Anne Midgette, "The Wisdom of Eve", Opera News, October 1999. Accessed via subscription 20 December 2007.
Bernard Holland, "Into the Woods but Leaving Hidden Meanings Behind", The New York Times, 8 June 2005. Accessed 20 December 2007.
Daniel J. Wakin, "Opera Orchestra of New York Says It May Reduce Concerts Next Season", The New York Times, 17 February 2007. Accessed 20 December 2007.
Jay Nordlinger, "A Stage for Opera's Overlooked", The New York Sun, 17 December 2007. Accessed 20 December 2007.

External links
 

New York City opera companies
Musical groups established in 1971
1971 establishments in New York City
Orchestras based in New York City
Carnegie Hall
Sony Classical Records artists